Garra cryptonema is a species of cyprinid endemic to the Nujiang River, Yunnan, China.  This species can reach a length of  SL.

References

cryptonema
Cyprinid fish of Asia
Freshwater fish of China
Fish described in 1984